TSV Eintracht Stadtallendorf is a German association football club from the city of Stadtallendorf, Hesse. The footballers are part of a sports club that also includes departments for athletics, badminton, gymnastics, handball, judo, swimming, and volleyball.

History
The origins of the club are in the establishment in 1920 of the football club Fußballverein Eintracht Allendorf. In 1956, this club merged with Turn- und Sportverein Blau-Weiß Allendorf to form the present day association.

Between 1965 and 1966, TSV played in the Landesliga Hessen/Nord (IV), before becoming part of the Landesliga Hessen/Mitte (IV) in 1967, where they played until being sent down following a 16th-place finish in 1970. The team slipped into lower-level competition before appearing in the Bezirksoberliga Gießen-Marburg Nord (VI) between 1991 and 1998. They won their way back to the Landesliga Hessen/Mitte (V) in 1998 on the strength of a first-place result in the Bezirksoberliga, and ten years later captured a Landesliga title to advance to the Oberliga Hessen (V). Since 2017 they have experienced a series of promotions and relegations between the Hessenliga and the Regionalliga Südwest.

Honours

League 
 Landesliga Hessen-Mitte (V)
 Champions: 2008, 2020
 Runners-up: 2004
 Bezirksoberliga Gießen-Marburg Nord
 Champions (VI): 1998

Cup
 Hesse Cup
 Runners-up: 1963

Recent managers
Recent managers of the club:

Recent seasons
The recent season-by-season performance of the club:

 With the introduction of the Regionalligas in 1994 and the 3. Liga in 2008 as the new third tier, below the 2. Bundesliga, all leagues below dropped one tier. Also in 2008, a large number of football leagues in Hesse were renamed, with the Oberliga Hessen becoming the Hessenliga, the Landesliga becoming the Verbandsliga, the Bezirksoberliga becoming the Gruppenliga and the Bezirksliga becoming the Kreisoberliga.

Current squad

Notable players
 Eike Immel, went on to play with Bundesliga teams Borussia Dortmund and VfB Stuttgart, as well as appearing with the national side and with Manchester City.

References

External links
 Official website 
 Eintracht Stadtallendorf at Weltfussball.de 
 Das deutsche Fußball-Archiv  historical German domestic league tables

Football clubs in Germany
Football clubs in Hesse
Association football clubs established in 1920
1920 establishments in Germany